Mukkam Muslim Orphanage (MMO) is an educational institution established in 1956 with 22 inmates.  Now 28 institutions are functioning under the MMO management. It won the central government’s National Award for Child Welfare in 1982 and 2008.

MMO is set in the valley of the Western Ghats, at Mukkam about 35 km north east of Calicut city, Kerala, India.

Institutions Under MMO

The committee runs the following institutions for achieving the proposed goal.
• Muslim Orphanage for Boys
• Muslim Orphanage for Girls
• Orphanage Madrasa Mukkam
• MMO LP School Mukkam
• MMO High School Mukkam
• Manassery Juma Masjid
• Working Women Hostel Mukkam
• Teachers Training Institute Mukkam
• Tailoring School
• Orphanage Madrasa Manassery
• MMO ITC MUkkam
• M.A.M.O. College Manassery
• Masjid Mariyam Mukkam
• Relief Center Mukkam
• VKH Memorial Arts College Mukkam
• MMO LP School Manassery
• M.K.H.M.M. Orphanage High School Manassery
• Hira Residential School Mukkam
• M.K.MH.M.M.O.H.S.S. Manassery
• M.K.MH.M.M.O.V.H.S.E for Girls Mukkam
• Islamic Cultural Center Mukkam
• Un-aided Higher Secondary School for Girls

History
The thriving, little town today pulsates with life that mainly revolves around the elegant MMO campus. Curiously, the credit for the entire institution, that today nurtures around 1,200 little souls, goes to a single family (Vayalil family) presided by the grand patriarch Moi Haji in 1950s. Moi Haji, his brothers and their sons owned 16,000 acres of land between them. They grew teak trees and traded in its valuable timber and elephants caught from the luxuriant forests of Western Ghats.

Vayalil family's philanthropy was legendary. The vast chunks of land they owned was donated in later decades for churches, temples, mosques, schools and hospitals in and around the tiny village. They thus earned the love and respect of all. This manifests itself in the strong fraternal bonds seen among Hindus and Muslims in the area. The village stood by river Iruvazhinhipuzha which has been immortalized by Malayalam novelist S. K. Pattakkad.

Around 1956, Vayalil Moideen Koya Haji thought of setting up an orphanage to educate and train the poor, orphaned and destitute kids. Thus was born the Mukkam Muslim Orphanage (MMO) which has been adjudged the winner of the National Child Welfare Award by the Government of India twice within a span of three decades i.e., 1982 and 2008.

The spirit of charity still runs in the family which manages the MMO today which over the years has developed into an institution of repute with vast paraphernalia. The family has endeared every one, be they Hindus, Muslims or Christians, in and around Mukkam. All swear by their integrity.

Awards and Achievements

•This orphanage won the National award for the `best orphanage` from the president of India in 1982 & 2008 competing with various institutions run by different religions across the country. This award was conferred taking in to account of the contribution of the orphanage in the field of education and rehabilitation of the inmates.

•The Mohammedan Educational Association, Calicut provides a Foundation Award every year in memory of Janab Kunhammad koya sahib, to an educational institution which gives more contribution to the society during 2009, this Award was won by our orphanage.

•Mohammed Ali Shihab, a product of MMO has emerged successful in the Civil Services Examination and has secured All India Rank 226th in 2011

References 

    MMO Institutions

External links
 Official Website

Education in Kozhikode district
Islam in Kerala
Orphanages in India
Kozhikode east
Institutes of higher Islamic learning in Kerala